The McNay Art Museum, founded in 1954 in San Antonio, is the first modern art museum in the U.S. state of Texas. The museum was created by Marion Koogler McNay's original bequest of most of her fortune, her important art collection and her 24-room Spanish Colonial Revival-style mansion that sits on  that are landscaped with fountains, broad lawns and a Japanese-inspired garden and fishpond.

McNay was an American painter and art teacher who inherited a substantial oil fortune upon the death of her father. The museum was named after her, and has been expanded to include galleries of medieval and Renaissance artwork and a larger collection of 20th-century European and American modernist work. She built a home in 1927 designed by Atlee Ayres and his son Robert M. Ayres. Upon her death, the house was bequeathed to the City of San Antonio to house the museum.

The museum focuses primarily on 19th- and 20th-century European and American art by such artists as Paul Cézanne, Pablo Picasso, Paul Gauguin, Henri Matisse, Georgia O'Keeffe, Diego Rivera, Mary Cassatt, and Edward Hopper. The collection today consists of over 20,000 objects and is one of the finest collections of contemporary art and sculpture in the Southwestern United States. The museum also is home to the Tobin Collection of Theatre Arts, which is one of the premiere collections of its kind in the U.S., and a research library with over 30,000 volumes.

The McNay Art Museum added the Jane and Arthur Stieren Center for Exhibitions in 2008, built by internationally renowned architect Jean-Paul Viguier, to display their Modern collection. The 45,000-square-foot structure houses light-filled galleries for special exhibitions, a glass-fronted gallery for sculpture from the museum's collection, a gallery for paper works, wall cases for small objects, and state-of-the-art lecture hall and learning centers. The center's elegant design, rich materials, and architectural details both contrast with and complement the original Spanish Colonial Revival-style residence, which it adjoins.

Collection highlights

See also
William J. Chiego, director (1991-2016)

References

 
 
 Marion Koogler McNay, Fine Art Dealers Association
 McNay Press Release 
 McNay Press Release

External links 

Contemporary art galleries in the United States
Art museums and galleries in Texas
Museums in San Antonio
1950 establishments in Texas
Art museums established in 1950
Modern art museums
Historic house museums in Texas
Spanish Colonial Revival architecture in Texas
Houses in San Antonio
Former private collections in the United States
Atlee B. Ayres buildings